The canton of Attigny is an administrative division of the Ardennes department, northern France. Its borders were modified at the French canton reorganisation which came into effect in March 2015. Its seat is in Attigny.

It consists of the following communes:

Alland'Huy-et-Sausseuil
Apremont
Ardeuil-et-Montfauxelles
Attigny
Aure
Autry
Beffu-et-le-Morthomme
Bouconville
Bourcq
Brécy-Brières
Cauroy
Challerange
Champigneulle
Charbogne
Chardeny
Chatel-Chéhéry
Chevières
Chuffilly-Roche
Condé-lès-Autry
Contreuve
Cornay
Coulommes-et-Marqueny
Dricourt
Écordal
Exermont
Falaise
Fléville
Givry
Grandham
Grandpré
Grivy-Loisy
Guincourt
Hauviné
Jonval
Lametz
Lançon
Leffincourt
Liry
Longwé
Machault
Manre
Marcq
Marquigny
Mars-sous-Bourcq
Marvaux-Vieux
Montcheutin
Monthois
Mont-Saint-Martin
Mont-Saint-Remy
Mouron
Neuville-Day
Olizy-Primat
Pauvres
Quilly
Rilly-sur-Aisne
La Sabotterie
Saint-Clément-à-Arnes
Sainte-Marie
Saint-Étienne-à-Arnes
Sainte-Vaubourg
Saint-Juvin
Saint-Lambert-et-Mont-de-Jeux
Saint-Loup-Terrier
Saint-Morel
Saint-Pierre-à-Arnes
Saulces-Champenoises
Savigny-sur-Aisne
Séchault
Semide
Semuy
Senuc
Sommerance
Sugny
Suzanne
Tourcelles-Chaumont
Tourteron
Vaux-Champagne
Vaux-lès-Mouron
Voncq

References

Cantons of Ardennes (department)